Fabricaciones Militares, the full name is Fabricaciones Militares Sociedad del Estado (Spanish for Military Industries State Corporation), is a state-owned Argentine arms manufacturer based in Buenos Aires. The company was a government agency under the name Dirección General de Fabricaciones Militares (Directorate General of Military Industries).

Founded in 1941, over the years the company has diversified into different areas such as mining, petroleum, rolling stock and petrochemicals. The company is under the direction of the Argentine Ministry of Defence.

History
The company was created in 1941, under Argentine law 12.709, in order to expand the Argentine defense industry to compensate for the shortfall of imports that came about during the Second World War. In its early years, it produced primarily small arms and munitions whilst aiding in the development of other key industries in the country. The company expanded quickly and would eventually have 14 factories around the country. However, starting in the 1980s, many of these plants were sold to private firms.

The company has a long history of producing rolling stock for the Argentine railways. It has produced trams, urban commuter rail trains, and trains for the Buenos Aires Underground.

In more recent years, the company has begun to grow again, acquiring new factories and expanding into more areas outside the arms industry. This includes the production of rolling stock for the state-owned rail operator Ferrocarriles Argentinos's freight division Trenes Argentinos Cargas y Logística, which recently ordered over 1,500 carriages.

In June 2015, the first 10 hopper cars manufactured by FM to transport cereal, were officially introduced as part of a contract to build 1050 cars for state-owned freight lines. The wagons were produced in FM's factory in Río Tercero, Córdoba and each one has a capacity for 45 tons of grains. It is expected that the factory will manufacture 3 wagons per day, to be used in the three lines operated by the National Government, the San Martín, Belgrano and Urquiza.

Other types of freight wagons to be produced by FM are flat, spine and tank cars.

On December 9 2016, the Argentine Ministry of Defense announced FM had signed an accord with Beretta to produce the ARX-200 rifle and Px4 pistol under license. It is expected these weapons will replace the FM license-built FN FAL and Browning Hi-Power currently in Argentine inventory.

Military production

Pistols 
Sistema Colt Modelo 1927 - Licensed version of Colt 1911.
FM Hi-Power - Licensed version of Browning Hi-Power.

Submachine guns 
FMK-3 - 9 mm indigenously designed submachine gun.
PAM-1 & PAM-2 - Licensed version of M3 submachine gun.

Rifles 
FM FAL - Produced under license version of belgium FN FAL battle rifle
FM FAP - Heavy barrel version of the FN FAL (Squad automatic weapon)
FM FSL - Semi-automatic version of the FN FAL
FARA 83 - 5,56 mm locally designed assault rifle
.22 Sport Rifle

Machines guns 
FN MAG - Produced under license.

Artillery 
FM Model 1968 - Anti-tank recoilless rifle.
FM CITER L33 - 155 mm howitzer.
FM L45 CALA 30 - 155 mm howitzer prototype.
FMK.4 Modelo 1L - 105 mm tank gun, used in TAM.
FM CP-30 - 127 mm rocket artillery.
Model 1968 recoilless gun
60 mm, 81 mm, 120 mm mortars.

Munitions 
7,65 mm Mauser
7,62 mm NATO
9 mm Parabellum
.22 Long Rifle
12-gauge shotgun
127 mm rocket munitions
38.1 mm chemical ammunition

Other products 
Gunpowder
Artillery propellants
Ballistic protection
HE-FRAG and tear gas grenades

Civilian production 
Sulfuric acid
Nitric acid
Ammonium nitrate
Diethyl ether
Mining explosives
Hopper car

Gallery

See also
 Río Tercero explosion
 Scandal over Argentine arms sales to Ecuador and Croatia
 Fabrica Militar de Aviones
 Armed Forces of the Argentine Republic
 Trams in Buenos Aires

References

Further reading 
 Dirección General de Fabricaciones Militares: un pilar industrial del país.  Torino, Manuel Cornejo. Ediciones Universidad Católica de Salta, Salta, Argentina, 2003.

External links

 
 "Tratarán de resucitar Fabricaciones Militares" - Diario Río Negro, October 1st 2006   accessed 2017-08-13

Manufacturing companies established in 1941
Rolling stock manufacturers of Argentina
Defense companies of Argentina
 
Argentine companies established in 1941